Storm Warning(s) may refer to:

Storm warning, a meteorological warning about a coming storm

Literature 
Storm Warning (Higgins novel), a 1976 novel by Jack Higgins
Storm Warning (Lackey novel), a 1994 fantasy novel by Mercedes Lackey
Storm Warning (Park novel), a 2010 novel by Linda Sue Park
Storm Warning, a 2000 novel by Monica Hughes

Film, television, and radio
Storm Warning (1951 film), a film starring Ronald Reagan
Storm Warning (2007 film), a film starring Nadia Farès and John Brumpton
"Storm Warnings", a 2003 episode of The Wire
Storm Warning (audio drama), a Doctor Who audio drama

Music 
Storm Warning!, a 1965 album by the Dick Morrissey Quartet
Storm Warning, a 2007 album by Tinsley Ellis 
Storm Warning (Murray McLauchlan album), a 1981 album by Murray McLauchlan
Stormwarning (Steve Roach album), 1989
Stormwarning (Ten album), 2011

Songs
"Storm Warning", a 1959 instrumental by Dr. John
"Storm Warning" (song), a 2011 single by Hunter Hayes